The Samuel Proctor Oral History Program (SPOHP) is the official oral history program at the University of Florida. With over 6,500 interviews and more than 150,000 pages of transcribed material, it is one of the premier oral history programs in the United States. SPOHP's mission is "to gather, preserve, and promote living histories of individuals from all walks of life." The program involves staff, undergraduate and graduate students, and community volunteers in its operation.

History 

The program was founded by Dr. Samuel Proctor in 1967 as the University of Florida Oral History Program. Its original projects were collections centered around Florida history with the purpose of preserving eyewitness accounts of economic, social, political, religious and intellectual life in Florida and the South. Major projects focused on Native American, African American, military, and Florida county-specific history. Much of SPOHP's early work was initiated by grants and support from the Doris Duke Foundation.

Dr. Samuel Proctor, the UF Oral History Program's original founder, was a prominent scholar of Florida history and a pioneer in the field of oral history in the United States. Dr. Proctor taught in the History Department at the University of Florida for fifty years, serving as the first official University of Florida Historian and Archivist and holding chairs as Distinguished Service Professor of History and Julian C. Yonge Professor of History. He was also the Director of the Center for Florida Studies and the History Curator at the Florida Museum of Natural History.

Following Dr. Proctor's tenure, the directorship of the program was taken up by Dr. Julian Pleasants, who renamed the program in Proctor's honor and lead the program from 1996 to 2007. The program's current director is Dr. Paul Ortíz. Dr. Ortíz is an associate professor in the History Department and affiliated faculty with the Center For Latin American Studies and African American Studies Program who also currently serves as the President of the Oral History Association.

Awards 

In October 2013, the Samuel Proctor Oral History Program was recognized by the Oral History Association with the Stetson Kennedy Vox Populi ("Voice of the People") award for outstanding achievement in using oral history to create a more humane and just world.

In April 2014, UF's Institute of Hispanic-Latino Cultures awarded SPOHP "Best Cultural Event" at the annual Noche de Gala ceremony for the production of the documentary, "Siempre Adelante: A Look at Faith and the Immigrant Struggle."

In August 2015, the Society of American Archivists recognized the Samuel Proctor Oral History Program and its Latina/o Diaspora in the Americas Project with the 2015 Diversity Award, for demonstrating significant achievement in archival activism, education, outreach, and service, based on long-term impacts improving and promoting diversity.

Field Research, Public Programs, and Education Initiatives 

The Samuel Proctor Oral History Program strives to promote the thousands of oral narratives entrusted in its care, making existing and emerging collections accessible to a wide audience by uploading transcripts of interviews, maintaining digital archives, creating educational podcasts, and organizing public programs and events. SPOHP also produces a newsletter, featuring new research and student work, that is published each semester.

SPOHP promotes the craft and intellectual traditions of oral history through university seminars, classes, and community-based workshops. SPOHP offers an internship class for 12-16 undergraduate students each semester, involving training in oral history practices and fieldwork experience, and also operates a program for volunteers on a rotating semester basis. The program consults on an ongoing basis with local historians, civic leaders, and educators across the country interested in initiating oral history projects in their towns and municipalities.

In November 2014, the Museum of Florida History in Tallahassee, Florida opened its first-ever civil rights exhibit, "Civil Rights in the Sunshine State," taking a frank look at African American history from the 19th through the 21st centuries. SPOHP's African American History Project contributed oral history recordings and related materials to the exhibit, and Dr. Ortíz played a role in two successive civil rights panels hosted by the museum during Black History Month in February 2015.

As of Spring 2015, over 60 original SPOHP podcasts are available to a global audience through the University of Florida Digital Collections and iTunes. These podcasts are created by staff, undergraduate and graduate students, and community volunteers with the intention of making oral histories shareable in an easy-to-access format. Most podcasts are under 15 minutes or less to facilitate easy access to local history for students, teachers, and the general public.

BA/MA 4+1 Combined Degree Program 

In October 2013, the UF History Department announced a new combined Bachelor's and Master's Degree Program in oral history. The program, open to students working in any field of modern history, is designed to train students in oral history practice to make history accessible to a broad audience and connect scholars and departments to their local communities. The track is open to students beginning in Spring 2014.

Events and Public Programs 

In the 2012–2013 school year, SPOHP hosted a variety of public events, including "Inside the Activists Studio: A Sit-in with Margaret Block," "Near Andersonville: Winslow Homer's Civil War" with Dr. Peter Wood, "Rebels and Runaways: Slave Resistance in 19th Century Florida" with Dr. Larry Rivers, "The Wonder of Their Voices: The 1946 Holocaust Interviews of Dr. David Boder" with Dr. Alan Rosen, "The Feminine Mystique at 50/Madmen, Working Girls, and Desperate Housewives: Men, Women, and Marriage in 1963 and 2013" with Stephanie Coontz.

In Fall 2013, SPOHP premiered the original documentary "Siempre Adelante: A Look at Faith and the Immigrant Struggle" on October 1, produced using interviews from the immigrant communities of Alachua County and Gainesville. It is SPOHP's third full-length documentary, featuring narratives of four immigrants from Mexico, El Salvador, and Guatemala who share the struggle of living undocumented in Alachua County, and have been supported by their faith in the face of fear and discrimination in the United States. In connection with UF Libraries' Department of Special & Area Studies Collections, SPOHP celebrated the donation of Stetson Kennedy's personal papers to the University of Florida on October 22. The all-day event concluded with an evening panel in Pugh Hall featuring FIU professor Marvin Dunn, folklorist Peggy Bulger, and sociologist Lucy Anne Hurston, niece of Zora Neale Hurston, in a discussion of Kennedy's legacy moderated by Ben Brotemarkle, with an introduction from UF First Lady Chris Machen.

In Spring 2014, SPOHP hosted three public programs. On January 15, 2014, renowned documentary filmmaker Tia Lessin screened award-winning film, "Trouble the Water" and hosted a symposium event. Through "Trouble the Water," New Orleans residents Kimberly Rivers Roberts and her husband Scott documented the destruction caused by Hurricane Katrina with their own original footage, as well as their struggle to recover in the following months. On March 12, 2014, SPOHP hosted a presentation by Vietnam veteran and political activist Scott Camil, who discussed his involvement in the Gainesville Eight trials and the donation of personal papers and documents related to the event to SPOHP and UF. Also on March 12, SPOHP organized a panel discussion with civil rights veterans to honor the 50th anniversary of the modern civil right movement in Florida. Students read excerpts from SPOHP's African American History Project (AAHP), providing the audience with more stories of others involved in the movement.

For the 2015–16 year, SPOHP will be organizing a series of public programs and events surrounding Latino history in Florida, funded by the National Endowment for the Humanities and American Library Association's "Latino Americans: 500 Years of History" $10,000 grant. Sarah McNamara, SPOHP alumna and PhD candidate in history at the University of North Carolina at Chapel Hill, will coordinate the programming in connection with SPOHP's Latina/o Diaspora in the Americas Project.

Fieldwork Research Trips 

During the Fall 2014 semester, SPOHP took a hiatus from planning public programs to plan publications and research trips, including the Virginia Fieldwork in Folklore trip in October 2014, organized by graduate coordinator Jessica Taylor. Taylor organized the trip to bring student interns and staff to work as field researchers in eastern Virginia, recording interviews related to folklore, traditional crafts, and rural development with residents of Mathews and Middlesex Counties. The trip featured two oral history open houses in Virginia, a methods workshop, and an interdisciplinary panel open to the public with folklorists, historians and archaeologists from the Virginia Folklife Program, College of William & Mary, and Fairfield Foundation. Virginia Folklife Program, Also during the fall semester, staff and students attended the 48th annual Oral History Association meeting in Madison, Wisconsin.

During the Spring 2015 semester, SPOHP continued field research trips, including the Appalachian Social Change Project in February 2015, organized by graduate coordinator Jessica Taylor. Taylor worked with Dr. Scott Huffard of Lees-McRae College to bring student interns and staff to work as field researchers in the Appalachian region of North Carolina,  recording interviews about rural development, folk culture, and tourism.

Additionally, Latina/o Diaspora in the Americas coordinator Génesis Lara organized the 11-day Documenting the Ethnic Studies Struggle Through Oral History fieldwork trip, taking place over spring break in collaboration with Prescott College. Student researchers on the trip will visit Tucson, Arizona to focus on discovering the importance of ethnic studies education in the United States. Working in collaboration with students and faculty from Prescott College, UC-Santa Barbara, and the University of New Mexico, and educators from the Tucson community, researchers will conduct oral history interviews and participate in workshops and panels. The trip sought to place University of Florida students and the Tucson community in conversation regarding their educational experiences and what role ethnic studies plays in students’ academic experiences.

Mississippi Freedom Project 

SPOHP's annual research trip to the Mississippi Delta builds its Mississippi Freedom Project collection, which focuses on civil rights history in the state of Mississippi, and serves to place undergraduate and graduate researchers in a dynamic environment to gather hands-on experience and knowledge of progressive social movements. SPOHP has partnered with the Sunflower County Civil Rights Organization, a non-profit organization consisting of Sunflower County Civil Rights veterans, as well as the Sunflower County Freedom Project, McComb Legacies Project, and Teaching for Change. The sixth annual research trip, in September 2013, was featured on the social justice network Groundswell.org.

In Summer 2013, UF's George A. Smathers Libraries approved a mini-grant proposal to transcribe the SPOHP's Mississippi Freedom Project collection. The completion of this project was timed to coincide with the 50th anniversary of Freedom Summer during the summer of 2014, when SPOHP presented the completed transcripts to veterans of the Mississippi Freedom Summer at their 50th anniversary reunion. This processing project leveraged existing knowledge, resources, and partnerships to promote online access to the Mississippi Freedom Project collection, including the development of a Freedom Summer LibGuide, two new podcasts, and a second phase which involves continuing transcription, Google Optimization of transcripts, and expanded Mississippi Freedom Project content on SPOHP's website.

The latest MFP research trip, the eighth in the collection's history, took place June 15–20, 2015, and included interviews in Natchez, Mississippi and in Montgomery, Alabama with the Southern Poverty Law Center and Equal Justice Initiative. Oral history interviews for the Mississippi Freedom Project are now available online at the University of Florida Digital Collections website.

Collections 

SPOHP is continuously engaged in active research projects designed to broaden the scope and scale of its collections, using contributions from undergraduate and graduate students as well as trained volunteers. SPOHP's collections house more than 6,500 oral history interviews on hundreds of different topics. The program also transcribes a portion of its interviews, which are available at the University of Florida Digital Collections online Samuel Proctor Oral History Program Digital Collection archive.

Veterans History Project 

In 2000, SPOHP was approached by the Library of Congress to assist in efforts with collecting oral history interviews of World War II veterans. Since that time, SPOHP has been conducting interviews for the Library's Veterans History Project, which is a project of its American Folklife Center. Ann Smith, a longtime SPOHP volunteer, is the project director. SPOHP has submitted over 100 interviews to date.

African American History Project 

SPOHP's African American History Project (AAHP) began in January 2010 with the mission of collecting 400 interviews on local African American history, giving particular attention to narratives on segregation under Jim Crow, as well as integration and Civil Rights. Originally conceived as the Alachua County African American History Project, AAHP quickly expanded into other parts of North and Central Florida, and now contains over 300 interviews with elders, leaders, activists, and other community members. A list of themes in the collection include: pre-integration black high schools and their contemporary legacies and significance; previously silenced narratives of racially motivated violence and repression; the quotidian socio-economics of providing for families and maintaining communities under Jim Crow; and the conflicted history of the University of Florida's interactions with and influence on local African American communities.

Interviews from the collection were used in the UF School of Theatre and Dance's original presentation, "Gator Tales," in February 2015. The original play, edited and directed by Kevin Marshall, used oral histories from the African American History Project to share the unique experiences of the first African American students at the University of Florida, "bring[ing] vividly to life the voices of those who first struggled for civil rights and the generations that followed." "Gator Tales" ran at UF February 13–22, 2015, in Edinburgh, Scotland at the Festival Fringe in Summer 2015, and at the Oral History Association annual meeting in Tampa, Florida on October 15, 2015.

SPOHP regularly develops documentaries, podcasts, and other audio selections to highlight interviews in its collections. SPOHP's archives also contains a variety of different sound files, including University of Florida speeches, videotapes of television interviews, Native American slides and photos, and recordings of music.

Featured projects include:

 African American History Project (AAHP)
 Coalition of Immokalee Workers
 Community Organizing in America
 Confederate Veterans
 Cold War History
 Disability History
 Duval County
 Everglades
 Everglades Jetport
 Fifth Avenue Blacks
 Florida Business Leaders
 Florida Environment and Ecology
 Florida Elections Project
 Florida Opportunity Scholars
 Florida Politics
 Florida Ranching
 Florida Water Management
 Haitian Revolution  Memories
 Immigration History in America
 Iraq Veterans
 Korean War
 Lumbee Indians
 Mississippi Choctaw
 Mississippi Freedom Project
 9/11 Project
 Nantucket Preservation
 Ocklawaha River Project
 Panama Canal Museum Project
 Returned Peace Corps Volunteers
 St. Augustine Civil Rights
 St. Augustine Historic Preservation
 Student Action with Farmworkers
 Suwannee River
 Tucson Ethnic Studies
 University of Florida
 UF College of Nursing
 UF Healthcare Center
 UF College of Law
 United Faculty of Florida
 Veterans History Project
 Vietnam War Veterans
 Women Activists Feminists
 Women's Police
 World War II Veterans

Featured interviewees:

 Shelby Foote
 A. Quinn Jones
 Stetson Kennedy
 Archie Carr
 Andrew Mickle
 Wilhelmina Johnson
 Farris Bryant
 LeRoy Collins
 Bob Graham
 Alan Bean
 Margaret Block
 Lawrence Guyot
 Bernie Machen
 Sadie Darnell
 Walter L. "Red" Barber
 Dr. Robert Cade
 General William Westmoreland
 Dave Barry
 William Dub Warrior
 Medea Benjamin
 Scott Camil 
 David Barsamian

See also 

Oral history
Samuel Proctor
University of Florida
College of Liberal Arts and Sciences
University of Florida Digital Collections
Oral History Association

External links 

 Samuel Proctor Oral History Program official website
 Samuel Proctor Oral History Program Oral History Archives at UF's Digital Collections
 Samuel Proctor Oral History Program YouTube Channel

References 

Oral history
University of Florida